Charles McRay Blow (born August 11, 1970) is an American journalist, commentator and op-ed columnist for The New York Times and current political analyst for MSNBC.

Early life
Blow was born and raised in Gibsland, Louisiana. He was educated at Gibsland-Coleman High School in his hometown, where he founded the school newspaper, and graduated as valedictorian in 1988.

Blow graduated magna cum laude from Grambling State University, with a bachelor's degree in mass communication.

Career
As a student, Blow interned at the Shreveport Times, News Journal, and The New York Times, edited the student newspaper, the Gramblinite, and founded the now-defunct student magazine, Razz. He also served as president of Grambling State's chapter of Kappa Alpha Psi fraternity.

After graduation, he joined The Detroit News as a graphics artist.

Blow joined The New York Times in 1994 as a graphics editor. Eventually, he became the head of the newspaper's graphics department. In 2006, he left to become the art director of National Geographic.

In April 2008, he began writing a column in The New York Times. His column had originally appeared biweekly on Saturdays. In May 2009, it became a weekly feature and appeared twice, weekly, in December 2012. As of May 2021, it appears every Monday and Thursday.

Blow would appear frequently on CNN and MSNBC during this period.

On February 22, 2012, Blow referred to Republican presidential candidate Mitt Romney's "magic underwear", an apparent reference to the Temple Garment, in response to a comment by Romney about two-parent households. The comment was criticized as insensitive to Mormons. In response, Romney joked that "I guess we’re finding out for the first time that the media is somewhat biased." Blow later apologized.

In 2014, Blow published the book-length memoir entitled Fire Shut Up In My Bones.

In August 2016, while appearing on CNN with Bruce Levell, a delegate for Donald Trump's presidential campaign, Blow called Trump a "bigot" and said that anyone who supported Trump is "a part of the bigotry itself."

In response to the Central Park birdwatching incident, Blow wrote an op-ed in which he said, "Specifically, I am enraged by White women weaponizing racial anxiety, using their White femininity to activate systems of White terror against Black men. This has long been a power White women realized they had and that they exerted."

In 2021, Blow published The Devil You Know: A Black Manifesto in which he advocates people of color taking direct action by moving to states where they can build a political majority.

In April 2021, Blow began hosting Prime with Charles M. Blow, a primetime show on the Black News Channel. It ran until March 2022 when the channel shut down all produced programming. On March 29, 2022, he joined MSNBC as a political analyst.

In June, 2019, Opera Theatre of Saint Louis presented the first performance of an opera adaptation of Blow's memoir Fire Shut Up in My Bones, with music by Grammy Award-winning jazz musician and composer Terence Blanchard. In September 2021, The Metropolitan Opera  in New York City opened its 2021-2022 season with that work. This was the Met's first performance of an opera by a Black composer.

Personal life
Blow's primary residence is in Atlanta and his secondary residence is in the New York City borough of Brooklyn where he raised his children. His eldest son, Tahj, graduated from Yale University and his twins, Ian and Iman, graduated from Middlebury College and Columbia University respectively.

In 2014, Blow came out publicly as bisexual. He is divorced.

In his autobiography, Fire Shut Up In My Bones, Blow revealed that he was sexually abused as a child by an older cousin.

References

External links

Blow's columns, The New York Times

1970 births
21st-century American non-fiction writers
African-American journalists
American art directors
American bloggers
American columnists
American male bloggers
Bisexual men
CNN people
Grambling State University alumni
Journalists from New York City
Lambda Literary Award winners
LGBT African Americans
American LGBT journalists
LGBT people from New York (state)
LGBT people from Louisiana
Living people
MSNBC people
Newspaper designers
People from Brooklyn
People from Gibsland, Louisiana
The Detroit News people
The New York Times columnists
American bisexual writers